
Year 814 (DCCCXIV) was a common year starting on Sunday (link will display the full calendar) of the Julian calendar.

Events 
 By place 

 Byzantine Empire 
 April 13 – Byzantine–Bulgarian Wars: Over the winter Krum, ruler (khan) of the Bulgarian Empire, had assembled a huge army (including Slavs and Avars), for a campaign against the Byzantine Empire. But before he sets out for a major attack on Constantinople, he dies of a stroke. Krum is succeeded by his son Omurtag.

 Europe 
 January 28 – Charlemagne dies of pleurisy in Aachen, after an almost 14-year reign (since 800) as the first Roman Emperor of Frankish origin (the precursor of the Holy Roman Emperor). He is embalmed and buried in Aachen Cathedral. Charlemagne is succeeded by his son Louis the Pious, as king of the Frankish Empire.
 Louis I establishes himself at the imperial court of Aachen. He appoints Benedict of Aniane as his chief advisor on religious matters, and makes him abbot of Kornelimünster Abbey, which is founded by him.

 Japan 
 Shinsen Shōjiroku, a record of the genealogy of the ancient Japanese noble families, is completed during the reign of Emperor Saga.

 By topic 
 Religion 
 Byzantine Iconoclasm: Conflict erupts between Emperor Leo V and Patriarch Nikephoros, on the subject of iconoclasm. The latter is excommunicated.

Births 
 Bodo, Frankish deacon (approximate date)
 Enchin, Japanese Buddhist monk (d. 891)
 Han Yunzhong, general of the Tang Dynasty (d. 874)
 Muhammad at-Taqi, Muslim ninth Ismā'īlī imam (or 813)
 Wu Zong, emperor of the Tang Dynasty (d. 846)
 Zhou Bao, general of the Tang Dynasty (d. 888)

Deaths 
 January 28 – Charlemagne, king and emperor of the Franks (b. 742)
 February 18 – Angilbert, Frankish diplomat and abbot
 April 4 – Plato of Sakkoudion, Byzantine abbot 
 April 13 – Krum, ruler (khan) of the Bulgarian Empire
 Abd-Allah ibn Numayr, Muslim narrator of hadith
 Abu Nuwas, Muslim poet (b. 756)
 Ailbhe of Ceann Mhara, Irish monk
 Baizhang Huaihai, Chinese Zen Buddhist monk (b. 720)
 Gruffydd ap Cyngen, Welsh prince (approximate date)
 Li Jifu, chancellor of the Tang Dynasty (b. 758)
 Meng Jiao, Chinese poet (b. 751)
 Odo of Metz, Frankish architect (b. 742)
 Reginfrid, King of Denmark
 Sugano no Mamichi, Japanese nobleman (b. 741)
 Triffyn ap Rhain, king of Dyfed (approximate date)
 Waldo of Reichenau, Frankish abbot and bishop
 William of Gellone, Frankish nobleman (or 812)
 Wu Shaoyang, general of the Tang Dynasty

References